The Wasilla Elementary School, located near the corner of East Swanson Avenue and North Boundary Street in Wasilla, Alaska is a historic one-room school that was built in 1917. It was Wasilla's first school, and served as its primary school until 1934 when a larger school was built. It was moved to its present location, in a historic park, shortly before its NRHP nomination in 1979. It had been located about three blocks away. After 1934 it was used again as a school overflow classroom and it also served as a community hall and for weddings, funerals and other events;  it served as a Church of Christ for a number of years.

The school was listed on the National Register of Historic Places in 1980.

See also
National Register of Historic Places listings in Matanuska-Susitna Borough, Alaska

References

1917 establishments in Alaska
1934 disestablishments in Alaska
School buildings completed in 1917
Churches in Alaska
Community centers in the United States
Defunct schools in Alaska
Buildings and structures on the National Register of Historic Places in Matanuska-Susitna Borough, Alaska
One-room schoolhouses in Alaska
Relocated buildings and structures in Alaska
School buildings on the National Register of Historic Places in Alaska
Schools in Matanuska-Susitna Borough, Alaska
Wasilla, Alaska